Bitterne railway station is located in eastern Southampton, England. It is on the main Southampton to Portsmouth coastal line, and serves the suburbs of Bitterne, Bitterne Manor, Bitterne Park and Midanbury.

History 

The station was opened in May 1866 as Bitterne Road railway station.  The station itself is located a mile west of Bitterne village, although original plans for the railway line would have seen the railway pass right through the centre of the village.

The line was originally single-track between St Denys and Fareham, with Bitterne acting as a "crossing station", where trains travelling in opposite directions could pass one another. There were three crossing stations on this stretch, with Netley and Swanwick being the other two.

Services 
South Western Railway operate all off-peak services at Bitterne using  EMUs.

The typical off-peak service in trains per hour is:
 1 tph to 
 1 tph to 

References

External links 

Railway stations in Southampton
DfT Category F2 stations
Former London and South Western Railway stations
Railway stations in Great Britain opened in 1866
Railway stations served by Govia Thameslink Railway
Railway stations served by South Western Railway
1866 establishments in England